John Etheridge Chadd (born 27 October 1933 in Whitestone, Hereford) is an English former cricketer who played two first-class matches for Worcestershire, one in 1955 and the other the following year.

He took two wickets, both in the first innings against Oxford University in 1956: lower-order batsmen Aubrey Walshe and Victor Clube. However, he conceded 84 runs from the 15 overs he sent down in that innings, and he never played first-class cricket again.

External links
 
 Statistical summary from CricketArchive

1933 births
Living people
English cricketers
Worcestershire cricketers